The 1871 West Staffordshire by-election was fought on 13 June 1871.  The byelection was fought due to the Death of the incumbent Conservative MP, Hugo Francis Meynell Ingram.  It was won by the unopposed Conservative candidate Francis Monckton.

References

1871 in England
1871 elections in the United Kingdom
By-elections to the Parliament of the United Kingdom in Staffordshire constituencies
Unopposed by-elections to the Parliament of the United Kingdom in English constituencies
19th century in Staffordshire